The Mohlapitse River is a small river in Limpopo Province, South Africa. It flows due south and is a central tributary of the Olifants River, joining its right bank at a 90° angle.

References

See also
 List of rivers of South Africa

Olifants River (Limpopo)
Rivers of Limpopo